Chester Willis (born May 2, 1958 in Elberton, Georgia) is a former halfback for the Oakland/Los Angeles Raiders. He collegiately played for Auburn Tigers.

References

1958 births
People from Elberton, Georgia
American football running backs
Auburn Tigers football players
Oakland Raiders players
Los Angeles Raiders players
Living people
Players of American football from Georgia (U.S. state)